"Relax" is a song by English synth-pop band Frankie Goes to Hollywood, released in the United Kingdom by ZTT Records in 1983. It was the band's debut single.

The hit version, produced by Trevor Horn and featuring the band along with other musicians, entered the UK Top 75 singles chart in November 1983 but did not crack the Top 40 until early January 1984. Three weeks later it reached number one, in the chart dated 28 January 1984, replacing Paul McCartney's "Pipes of Peace". One of the decade's most controversial and most commercially successful records, "Relax" eventually sold a reported two million copies in the UK alone, easily ranking among the ten biggest-selling singles ever. It remained in the UK Top 40 for 37 consecutive weeks, 35 of which overlapped with a radio airplay ban by the BBC (owing to lyrics perceived as overtly sexual). In June 1984, bolstered by the instant massive success of the band's follow-up single "Two Tribes", the single re-entered the Top Ten for a further nine weeks including two spent at number two (behind "Two Tribes"). At that time Frankie Goes to Hollywood were the only act apart from the Beatles and John Lennon to concurrently occupy the top two positions on the chart. Several 12-inch single versions (and the "Frankie Say Relax" t-shirt craze) fed the "Relax" phenomenon. The single re-entered the UK Top 75 in February 1985, and, more successfully, in October 1993, when it spent three weeks in the Top Ten.

In the United States "Relax" was also comparatively slow in reaching its chart peak. Released in March 1984, albeit with a different mix and nearly a minute shorter in length, the single stalled at no. 67 on Billboard's Hot 100 in May during a seven-week run, but it ranked number one for the year on Los Angeles "alternative rock" station KROQ, as voted for by listeners. In January 1985, a release of "Relax" that was far more similar to the UK hit version entered the Hot 100 at no. 70, and in March it reached no. 10 during its 16-week run. In January 1989 the single was certified gold by the RIAA.

In February 1985 the record was awarded Best British Single of 1984 at the Brit Awards, and Frankie Goes to Hollywood won Best British Newcomer. A version of the song features on Frankie Goes to Hollywood's debut album Welcome to the Pleasuredome, released in October 1984.

Background and recording

Singer Holly Johnson has claimed that the words of the song came to him as he was walking down Princess Avenue in Liverpool: "I mean they were just, you know, words that floated into my head one day when I was walking down Princess Avenue with no bus fare, trying to get to rehearsals – I mean there was no great sort of calculated, 'Oh I'll sing these words and this record’ll be banned'."

ZTT Records signed Frankie Goes to Hollywood after producer-turned-ZTT cofounder Trevor Horn saw the band play on the television show The Tube, on which the group played an early version of "Relax". Horn described the original version of "Relax" as "More a jingle than a song", but he preferred to work with songs that were not professionally finished because he could then "fix them up" in his own style. Once the band was signed, ZTT co-founder Paul Morley mapped out the marketing campaign fashioned as a "strategic assault on pop". Morley opted to tackle the biggest possible themes in the band's singles ("sex, war, religion"), of which "Relax" would be the first, and emphasized the shock impact of Frankie members Holly Johnson's and Paul Rutherford's open homosexuality in the packaging and music videos.

Horn dominated the recording of "Relax" in his effort for perfectionism. Initial sessions with the group were held at The Manor Studio: the band were overawed and intimidated by Horn's reputation, and thus were too nervous to make suggestions. Johnson said in his autobiography, "Whatever he said we went along with". When attempts to record with the full band proved unsatisfactory, Horn hired former Ian Dury backing band the Blockheads for the sessions, with Norman Watt-Roy providing the original bass line. Those sessions were later deemed to be not modern-sounding enough. 

Horn then constructed a more electronic-based version of the song with keyboards by session musician Andy Richards and with rhythm programming assistance from J. J. Jeczalik of Art of Noise. Horn developed this version of the recording in his west London studio while the band remained in their hometown of Liverpool. Horn had made three versions of "Relax" prior to Richards and guitarist Stephen Lipson joining his ZTT Production 'Theam' in late 1983. Horn left the studio late one night asking for Lipson to erase the multitrack (of version 3) due to lack of progress, but came back into the studio some time later to hear Richards playing a variety of modal chords based around the key of E minor with Lipson playing guitar along to the unerased multitrack.

Ultimately lead vocalist Johnson was the only band member to perform on the record; the only contribution by the other members was a sample crafted from the sound of the rest of the band jumping into a swimming pool. Johnson later said that "Trevor didn’t like the band’s standard of playing as he couldn’t sync it to his machinery". Horn explained years later, "I was just... Look, 'Relax' had to be a hit." Despite the band's absence from the record, Horn said, "I could never have done these records in isolation. There was no actual playing by the band, but the whole feeling came from the band." 

In a 2021 interview, Horn said that "the band we signed weren’t quite the band who had appeared on the original demo (of "Relax"), though we didn't know that at the time". The demo had featured Jed O'Toole, brother of bassist Mark O'Toole, on guitar, who subsequently left to pursue a 9-to-5 career. He was replaced by Brian Nash, who was a guitar novice at the time the single was recorded, though Horn acknowledged that he developed into a good guitarist by the time Welcome to the Pleasuredome was completed. Horn completed the recording having spent £70,000 in studio time.

Release, controversy and ban by the BBC
Morley intentionally courted scandal with the promotion of "Relax". ZTT initiated the ad campaign for "Relax" with two quarter-page ads in the British music press. The first ad featured images of Rutherford in a sailor cap and a leather vest, and Johnson with a shaved head and rubber gloves. The images were accompanied by the phrase "ALL THE NICE BOYS LOVE SEA MEN", a pun on the music hall song "Ship Ahoy! (All the Nice Girls Love a Sailor)". It declared "Frankie Goes to Hollywood are coming ... making Duran Duran lick the shit off their shoes ... Nineteen inches that must be taken always." The second ad promised "theories of bliss, a history of Liverpool from 1963 to 1983, a guide to Amsterdam bars".

When first released in November 1983, the initial progress of "Relax" on the UK Top 75 was sluggish. First charting at number 67, by its seventh week on the chart it had progressed only to number 35, even falling back slightly during that time. But then on Thursday 5 January 1984, Frankie Goes to Hollywood performed "Relax" on the BBC flagship television chart show, Top of the Pops. The following week it soared to number 6. On 11 January 1984, Radio 1 disc jockey Mike Read expressed on air his distaste for both the record's suggestive sleeve (designed by Anne Yvonne Gilbert) and its lyrics, which centred on the oft-repeated "Relax, don't do it/When you want to sock it to it/Relax, don't do it/ When you want to come." He announced his refusal to play the record, not knowing that the BBC had just decided that the song was not to be played on the BBC anyway. Holly Johnson contends that the lyrics were misheard - rather than "When you want to sock it to it", the lyric is "When you want to suck, chew it".

In support of their disc jockey, BBC Radio banned the single from its shows a reported two days later (although certain prominent night-time BBC shows – including those of Kid Jensen and John Peel – continued to play the record, as they saw fit, throughout 1984). The now-banned "Relax" rose to number 2 in the charts by 17 January, and hit the number-one spot on 24 January. By this time, the BBC Radio ban had extended to Top of the Pops as well, which simply displayed a still picture of the group during its climactic Number One announcement, before airing a performance by a non-Number One artist.

This went on for the five weeks that "Relax" was at number one. It then began a slow decline on the charts, falling back as far as number 31 in May 1984 before returning to number two in July whilst Frankie's follow-up single "Two Tribes" held the UK number-one spot. In the end, "Relax" remained on the Top 75 for 48 consecutive weeks and returned in February 1985 for four more, giving a total of 52.

The ban became an embarrassment for the BBC, especially given that UK commercial radio and television stations were still playing the song. Later in 1984 the ban was lifted and "Relax" featured on both the Christmas Day edition of Top of the Pops and Radio 1's rundown of the best-selling singles of the year.

Throughout the "Relax" controversy, the band continued to publicly deny that the song's lyrics were sexual. Nevertheless, by 1984, it was clear that the public were aware of the sexual nature of the lyrics, but the scandal had fuelled sales anyway. In 1985, with the release of the Welcome to the Pleasuredome album (which included "Relax"), the band dropped any public pretence about the lyrics: 

The track was reissued in September 1993, the first of a string of Frankie Goes to Hollywood singles to be reissued that year. It debuted at a high number six on the UK singles chart and peaked at number five the next week. It spent seven weeks on the Top 75 this time, thus extending its combined total to 59, making it the third longest runner of all time (seven other singles have since surpassed it; now it is in joint 10th place).

Critical reception
American magazine Cash Box said that the song is "a very danceable cut", in which "heavy bass and bass drum provide the backdrop for Frankie’s pleading lyric and Frank Sinatraesque soaring vocal." Alan Jones from Music Week gave the 1993 remix four out of five, writing, "ZTT recently got its catalogue back from Island, and is about to embark on a high profile re-issue/remix campaign, of which this is the first fruit. "Relax" is updated by Ollie J in a stomping house mix, while Jam & Spoon's pumped-up Hi-NRG version is hardcore tempo. With the original mixes added to the package, this is going to be big all over again. But will One FM play it?"

Original 1983–1984 mixes
Although the 7-inch version of the single remained unchanged throughout its initial release (a mix generally known as "Relax (Move)"), promotional 7-inch records featuring a substantially different mix of "Relax" (entitled either "The Last Seven Inches" or "Warp Mix" because it is a compilation of other versions) were the subject of a limited 1984 release.

Three principal 12-inch remixes of "Relax" were eventually created by producer Trevor Horn:

One of the reasons we did all the remixes was that the initial 12-inch version of 'Relax' contained something called 'The Sex Mix', which was 16 minutes long and didn't even contain a song. It was really Holly Johnson just jamming, as well as a bunch of samples of the group jumping in the swimming pool and me sort of making disgusting noises by dropping stuff into buckets of water! We got so many complaints about it — particularly from gay clubs, who found it offensive — that we cut it in half and reduced it down to eight minutes, by taking out some of the slightly more offensive parts [this became "Sex Mix (Edition 2)"]. Then we got another load of complaints, because the single version wasn't on the 12-inch — I didn't see the point in this at the time, but I was eventually put straight about it.

Horn attested that visits to New York's Paradise Garage club led to the creation of the final "Relax (New York Mix)", which ultimately replaced the original "Sex Mix" releases:

It was only when I went to this club and heard the sort of things they were playing that I really understood about 12-inch remixes. Although I myself had already had a couple of big 12-inch hits, I'd never heard them being played on a big sound system, and so I then went back and mixed 'Relax' again and that was the version which sold a couple of million over here [in the UK].

The original 12-inch version of "Relax", labelled "Sex Mix", ran for over 16 minutes, and is broadly as described by Horn above. The subsequent "Edition 2" was an 8-minute-plus edit of the "Sex Mix", and can only be distinguished by having 12ISZTAS1 etched on the vinyl. The final 12-inch mix, containing no elements from the foregoing versions, was designated the "New York Mix", and ran for approximately 7:20. This was the most commonly available 12-inch version of "Relax" during its worldwide 1984 chart success.

The UK cassette single featured "Greatest Bits", a unique amalgam of excerpts from the "Sex Mix", "New York Mix", "Move" and an instrumental version of "Move".

Since virtually all of the UK "Relax" 12-inch singles were labelled "Sex Mix", a method of differentiating between versions by reference to the record's matrix numbers necessarily became de rigueur for collectors of Frankie Goes to Hollywood releases (and ultimately collectors of ZTT records in general).

"Relax (Come Fighting)" was the version of the song included on the Welcome to the Pleasuredome album. This is ostensibly a variant of the 7-inch single "Move" mix, but is different from that version. For example, the 7" mix fades in on a foghorn type sound while the album mix fades in on sustained synth chords. Also, the backing vocals of the 7" mix are panned to the left, whereas they are mixed in the centre on the album version. Additionally, the 7" mix features a prominent reverberated kick drum sound during the introduction that also appears in other parts of the song, which is completely absent from the album mix. The album mix also has a certain post-production sheen (greater stereo separation of parts, more strategic uses of reverb, etc.) that is absent from the original 1983 7-inch single mix. The "Classic 1993 Version" is a version of the original 7" mix that uses "Bonus, Again" as the instrumental track, although modification with elements from "Come Fighting" thrown in (e.g. both the intro and outro come directly from it) and much of it made to sound more clear.

The original airing of Relax on The Tube, before the band were signed to ZTT, featured another verse that was edited from all the released versions, "In heaven everything is fine, you've got yours and I've got mine", presumably removed as it was taken directly from the David Lynch film Eraserhead.

According to a fan enquiry by a member of the Alternate forum (a forum dedicated to ZTT) to Holly Johnson over accusation that "Edition 2" was created by a DJ, "Edition 2" was edited by Trevor Horn at the Sarm East studio with J. J. Jeczalik engineering and Johnson watching.

B-sides
The 7-inch featured "One September Monday", an interview between ZTT's Paul Morley, Holly Johnson and Paul Rutherford. During the interview, Holly revealed that the group's name derived from a page of the New Yorker magazine, headlined "Frankie Goes Hollywood" and featuring Frank Sinatra "getting mobbed by teenyboppers".

On all of the original 12-inch releases, the B-side featured a cover of "Ferry 'Cross the Mersey", followed by a brief dialogue involving Rutherford attempting to sign on, and an a cappella version of the title track's chorus, segueing into an instrumental version of "Relax", known as "Bonus, Again" (which resembles "Come Fighting" more than the 7" mix).

The UK cassette single included "Ferry 'Cross the Mersey" and interview sections not included on "One September Monday".

Videos
The first official music video for "Relax", directed by Bernard Rose and set in an S&M themed gay nightclub, featuring the bandmembers accosted by buff leathermen, a glamorous drag queen, and an obese admirer dressed up as a Roman emperor, played by actor John Dair, was allegedly banned by MTV and the BBC, prompting the recording of a second video, directed by Godley and Creme in early 1984, featuring the group performing with the help of laser beams. However, after the second video was made the song was banned completely by the BBC, meaning that neither video was ever broadcast on any BBC music programmes.

A live performance video of the song was directed by David Mallet, making the rounds at MTV.

Another MTV video of the studio version includes footage from the Brian De Palma film Body Double. Body Double, a popular 1984 erotic thriller film, contains a film within a film sequence in which Frankie Goes to Hollywood performs Relax on the set of a porn film.

Track listings
 All discographical information pertains to original UK releases only unless noted
 "Relax" written by Peter Gill/Johnson/Mark O'Toole
 "One September Monday" credited to Gill/Johnson/Morley/Brian Nash/O'Toole/Rutherford
 "Ferry 'Cross the Mersey" written by Gerry Marsden

 7": ZTT / ZTAS 1 (United Kingdom)
 "Relax" – 3:53
 "One September Monday" – 4:47
 Also released as a 7" picture disc (P ZTAS 1)

 12" ZTT / 12 ZTAS 1 (United Kingdom) "Relax" (Sex Mix) - 16:24
 "Ferry 'Cross the Mersey" – 4:03
 "Relax" (Bonus, Again) – 4:31  
 Later reissued in 1984 in a generic sleeve, with the text "Original Mix" on the label.
 Mastered at 33⅓ RPM, despite claiming to run at 45 RPM on the label. The 1984 reissue runs at 45 RPM.

 12": ZTT / 12 ZTAS 1 (United Kingdom) "Relax" (Sex Mix, Edition 2) - 8:20
 "Ferry 'Cross the Mersey" – 4:03
 "Relax" (Bonus, Again) – 4:31
 "Edition 2" is an edit of "Sex Mix". Commonly nicknamed the "New York Mix"

 12": ZTT / 12 ZTAS 1 (United Kingdom) "Relax" (New York Mix) – 7:23
 "Ferry 'Cross the Mersey" – 4:03
 "Relax" (Bonus, Again) – 4:31
 "Relax" (New York Mix) is also known as "Relax" (U.S. Mix)
 Also released as a 12" picture disc (12 PZTAS 1).

 12": Island / 0-96975 (United States) "Relax" (New York Mix) – 7:23
 "Relax" (Come Fighting) – 3:53
 "Relax" (Bonus, Again) – 4:31
 "New York Mix" labelled as "Long version"
 The mixes on the B-side are not stated on the label.
 also released on MC in Canada (Island / ISC-69750)

 12": ZTT / 062-2000686 (Greece) "Relax" (Greek Disco Mix) - 6:15
 "Ferry 'Cross the Mersey" – 4:03
 "Relax" (Bonus, Again) – 4:31
 "Disco Mix" (a.k.a. "The Greek Disco Mix") is a combination of "Relax (7" Mix)" and "Sex Mix (Edition 2)"
 "Disco Mix" (a.k.a. "The Greek Disco Mix") is labelled as "Relax" (Sex Mix) on the original 12", which is incorrect.

 MC: ZTT / CTIS 102 "From Soft To Hard – From Dry To Moist"
 "Relax" (Greatest Bits) - 16:49
 "The Party Trick" (acting dumb) – 0:36
 "The Special Act" (adapted from the sex mix) – 7:46
 "The US Mix" (come dancing) – 4:38
 "The Single" (the act) – 3:55
 "Later On" (from One September Monday) – 1:36
 "Ferry Across The Mersey (...and here I'll stay)" – 4:06
 "The mixes on this Cassette single reissued on vinyl for Record Store Day 2022 as Side A of 'Altered Reels' - The Cassette single of "Two Tribes" was reissued on Side B."

Re-issues
The title track has periodically been reissued as a single in a number of remix forms.

1993 re-issues

 CD: ZTT / FGTH1CD "Relax" (Classic 1993 Version) – 3:55
 "Relax" (MCMXCIII) – 3:42
 "Relax" (Ollie J. Remix) – 6:38
 "Relax" (Jam & Spoon Trip-O-Matic Fairy Tale Remix) – 7:52
 "Relax" (Jam & Spoon HI N-R-G Remix) – 7:55
 "Relax" (New York Mix - The Original 12") – 7:22

 2x12": ZTT / SAM 1231 "Relax" (Ollie J. Remix) – 6:38
 "Relax" (Trip-Ship Edit) – 6:12
 "Relax" (Ollie J's Seven Inches) – 3:30
 "Relax" (Jam & Spoon HI N-R-G Remix) – 7:55
 "Relax" (Jam & Spoon Trip-O-Matic Fairy Tale Remix) – 7:52
 "Relax" (MCMXCIII) – 3:42
 UK 12" promo

2001 re-issues

 CD: Repertoire Records / REP 8027 (Germany) "Relax" (Classic 1993 Version) - 3:56
 "One September Monday" - 4:50
 "Ferry Cross The Mersey" - 4:06 
 "Relax MCMXCIII" - 3:43
 "Relax" (original video) - 4:07

 CD: Star 69 / STARCD 520 (US) "Relax" (Peter Rauhofer's Doomsday Radio Mix) – 3:45
 "Relax" (Peter Rauhofer's Doomsday Club Mix) – 9:47
 "Relax" (Saeed & Palash Addictive Journey) – 11:16
 "Relax" (Coldcut Remix) – 4:59
 "Relax" (Peter Rauhofer's Doomsday Dub) – 6:27
 "Relax" (Original New York 12" Mix) – 7:31
 "Relax" (Original Radio Mix) – 3:54

2009 re-issues
 CD: Universal Music TV/All Around The World (UK) "Relax" (Chicane Radio Edit) - 3:55
 "Relax" (Chicane Remix) - 10:05
 "Relax" (Den Broeder, Cox, Cantrelle Radio Edit) - 3:46
 "Relax" (Den Broeder, Cox, Cantrelle Club Mix) - 7:39
 "Relax" (Den Broeder, Cox, Cantrelle Dub Mix) - 6:39
 "Relax" (LMC Remix) - 6:18
 "Relax" (Lockout's Radio Edit) - 3:31
 "Relax" (Lockout's London Mix) - 6:16
 "Relax" (Spencer & Hill Radio Edit) - 3:21
 "Relax" (Spencer & Hill Remix) - 5:40
 "Relax" (Scott Storch Mix)  - 3:45
 Promotional release.
 Tracks 3-5 are credited as “Jody Den Broeder Remix”.

 12": Universal Music TV/All Around The World / 12GLOBE1167 (UK) "Relax" (Chicane Remix) - 10:05
 "Relax" (Lockout's Radio Edit) - 3:30
 "Relax" (New York Mix) - 7:24
 "Relax" (Den Broeder, Cox, Cantrelle Radio Edit) - 3:42
 Limited to 900 copies.
 "New York Mix" mislabelled as "US Mix", arguably one of the few ZTT releases to do so.

 Digital Download: Universal Music TV/All Around The World (UK) "Relax" (Original 7") - 3:55
 "Relax" (Chicane Radio Edit) - 3:11
 "Relax" (Den Broeder, Cox, Cantrelle Radio Edit) - 3:42
 "Relax" (Lockout's Radio Edit) - 3:30
 "Relax" (Spencer & Hill Radio Edit) - 3:21

2014 re-issues
 12": ZTT/Salvo / SALVOTWS01 (UK) "Relax" (Sex Mix Edit) [mislabeled as "Sex Mix Edition 3"] - 8:10
 "Ferry 'Cross the Mersey" – 4:03
 "Relax" (Bonus, Again) – 4:31
 "Sex Mix Edit" was mixed by Luis Jardim with Bob Painter as engineer on 13 December 1984, having taken the multitracks with him (according to the booklet of The Art of The 12" Volume 2). It was first released on the 2009 Japanese "Return to the Pleasuredome" box set by accident, due to confusion with “Sex Mix Edition 2”.
 "Bonus, Again" mislabelled "The Instrumental", as if it was an unreleased mix.

 Digital Download: ZTT (UK)' "Relax" (7" Mix) - 3:56
 "Relax" (Sex Mix) - 16:25
 "Relax" (New York Mix) - 7:26
 "Relax' (Greatest Bits) - 16:50
 "Relax" (Sex Mix Edition 2) - 8:25
 "Relax" (Sex Mix Edit) [mislabeled as "Sex Mix Edition 3"] - 8:10
 "Relax" (Greek Disco Mix) - 6:16
 "Relax" (The Last Seven Inches!) - 3:32
 "One September Monday" - 4:49
 "Ferry Cross The Mersey" - 4:08
 "Relax" (Bonus, Again) - 4:35

Charts

 Weekly charts 

Year-end charts

Sales and certifications

Cover versions and usage in media

 U2 performed a snippet of the song during some live shows on their The Unforgettable Fire Tour (1984), Vertigo Tour (2005) and U2360° Tour (2009/2010/2011).
Akina Nakamori performed during live tour Bitter And Sweet Summer Tour in 1985.
"Relax" is used in the film Zoolander (2001), where the titular character is conditioned with the song. Limp Bizkit also recorded their own version for the film, though Powerman 5000's cover was used instead, in both the film and on the soundtrack. "Relax" was used for the trailer of Zoolander 2 (2016).
Blondie recorded a version featuring Keilah Baez, Felicia Dennis and Keisha Williams for their disk two: Ghosts of Download from Blondie 4(0) Ever. British drag performer Joe Black created a cabaret cover version after his and fellow drag performer Bimini’s lip sync to the song on season 2 of RuPaul's Drag Race UKMarvel's Guardian of the Galaxy features the song in the jukebox of the Milano.
The extended 7 minute version is used in the intro of the  Miami Vice episode “Little Prince”, aired December 14, 1984.
The song also features on the soundtrack of the films Body Double (1984) and T2 Trainspotting (2017), the video game Grand Theft Auto: Vice City Stories (2006) on the fictional in-game radio station Wave 103, the video game Call of Duty: Infinite Warfare (2016) in the “Zombies” mode, and on the soundtrack to the 2018 interactive film Black Mirror: Bandersnatch''.

See also
List of songs banned by the BBC

Bibliography

References

1983 debut singles
1983 songs
1984 singles
Brit Award for British Single
Controversies in the United Kingdom
Frankie Goes to Hollywood songs
Judge Dread songs
LGBT-related songs
Songs banned by the BBC
Music videos directed by Godley and Creme
Number-one singles in Finland
Number-one singles in France
Number-one singles in Germany
Number-one singles in Greece
Number-one singles in Israel
Number-one singles in Italy
Number-one singles in Spain
Number-one singles in Switzerland
LGBT-related controversies in music
Obscenity controversies in music
Songs written by Holly Johnson
Songs written by Mark O'Toole (musician)
Songs written by Peter Gill (FGTH drummer)
UK Singles Chart number-one singles
Music Week number-one dance singles
ZTT Records singles
Music videos directed by David Mallet (director)